GD 40 is a white dwarf in the constellation Cetus. It is located about 212 light-years (65 parsecs) away from the Sun. The star's spectrum has been found to show traces of external of metal contamination due to disruption of an extrasolar dwarf planet or an asteroid. The disrupted object should have had roughly the same mass of the Solar System asteroid 3 Juno.

See also

ZZ Piscium
GD 61, white dwarf with an observed asteroid

References

Cetus (constellation)
White dwarfs